Special forces are elite military units trained for unconventional missions.

Special Force or Special Forces can also refer to:

Military

 United States Army Special Forces (also known as the "Green Berets"), the largest unit within US Army Special Operations Command (USASOC)
 Young Men (Lebanon), an armed group of the Lebanese Civil War also known as Special Force
 Kikosi Maalum, a Ugandan militant group whose name is translated as "Special Force"

Arts, entertainment, and media

Comics
 Special Forces (comics), a comic book by Kyle Baker

Films
 Special Forces (2003 film), an American film
 Forces spéciales, a French film

Television
 Special Forces: World's Toughest Test, an American television series

Games
 Mortal Kombat: Special Forces, an adventure game, spin-off from the Mortal Kombat series
 Battlefield 2: Special Forces, an expansion for the video game Battlefield 2
 Special Force (2003 video game),  a first-person shooter military video game, published by the group Hezbollah
 Special Force (2004 video game), an online free-to-play first-person shooter developed by the South Korean game developer Dragonfly
 Special Forces (video game), the 1991 sequel to Airborne Ranger by MicroProse

Music
 Special Forces (38 Special album), 1982
 Special Forces (Alice Cooper album), 1981
 Special Forces (Big Ed album), 2000
 Special Forces (Julian Fane album), 2004

See also

Special operations
Commando
SOF: Special Ops Force (TV series)